Katie Barnhart is an American pair skater. With partner Charles Bernard, she is the 1997 U.S. junior silver medalist and 1997 Golden Spin of Zagreb champion.

Results
pairs (with Bernard)

References

External links
 Pairs on ice profile

American female pair skaters
Living people
Year of birth missing (living people)
21st-century American women
20th-century American women